Max Thompson (born August 24, 1984 in Prince Albert, Saskatchewan) is a Canadian Nordic combined skier.

Thompson made his World Cup debut in January 2006 at Harrachov, Czech Republic. His best World Cup result to date also came at Harrachov, in 2007, when he finished 30th in the 10 kilometre Gundersen race.

Thompson has also competed in two World Championships, with his best performances being 41st places in the 2005 Gundersen and the 2007 sprint races.

Thompson competed at the 2006 Winter Olympics, in both the individual and sprint events. He finished 44th in the former and 46th in the latter.

References

External links
FIS profile

1984 births
Canadian male Nordic combined skiers
Living people
Nordic combined skiers at the 2006 Winter Olympics
Olympic Nordic combined skiers of Canada
Sportspeople from Prince Albert, Saskatchewan